"Love by Grace" is a song by the Belgian singer Lara Fabian. It was released as the fourth single of her self-titled album.

The ballad was a smash hit in Brazil and was part of the soundtrack of the Brazilian hit soap opera Laços de Família.

Reception
The Dooyoo review was extremely positive, and it said: "This is a beautiful song - beautifully sung and arranged. Originally recorded by Wynonna Judd in the album Revelations, the country feel has been stripped from the song and in Fabian's hands it becomes a stunning ballad. Produced by Walter Afanasieff, he reigns in Fabian's vocals until close to the end, but still finishes the song softly. 8/10".

Track list
Love by Grace
I Will Love Again (Live From PBS)
To Love Again (Si Tu M'Aimes)
Caruso (Live From PBS)

Chart success
The song became the most played song in Brazil during the 2000 year and became a classic in the country, due to the inclusion of the song on the soundtrack of the soap opera Laços de Família. The song became the theme from Carolina Dieckmann's character "Camila", who had cancer. While shaving her head, the song was played in the background and this became one of the most memorable scenes from a soap opera in the country. It was the most played song in Brazil in the 2000s.

Music video
The music video was taken from a live performance of the song.

Charts

Cover versions
The Brazilian recording artist Marina Elali recorded a version of the song called: "Só Por Você", which was include on her 2006 self-titled album.

The gospel group Anointed covered the song for its 1999 self-titled album.

References

2000 singles
Song recordings produced by Walter Afanasieff
Songs written by Dave Loggins
Lara Fabian songs
Pop ballads
2000s ballads
Songs written by Wayne Tester